Kusatsu-minami is a Hiroden station on Hiroden Miyajima Line, located in Kusatsu-minami, Nishi-ku, Hiroshima.

Routes
From Kusatsu-minami Station, there is one of Hiroden Streetcar routes.
 Hiroshima Station - Hiroden-miyajima-guchi Route

Connections
█ Miyajima Line

Kusatsu — Kusatsu-minami — Shoko Center-iriguchi

Around station
Hiroden Arate train shed
Hiroshima City Central Wholesale Market
Kusatcu Fishing Port - the birthplace of oyster culture

History
Opened as "Arate" on April 6, 1924.
Renamed to "Chuo-ichiba-mae" on September 1, 1951.
Renamed to the present name "Kusatsu-minami", on November 1, 1979.

See also
Hiroden Streetcar Lines and Routes

References

Hiroden Miyajima Line stations
Railway stations in Japan opened in 1924